Captain Sandy was a New Zealand-bred Standardbred racehorse. He is notable in that he won two Inter Dominion Pacing Championship races and two Auckland Cups. He was inducted into the Inter Dominion Hall of Fame, being the first horse to win two grand finals of the race.

He was foaled in 1942 at Oamaru, in the South Island of New Zealand, and reared as a poddy foal, owing to an uncaring dam. Captain Sandy was by Sandydale (USA) P.2:01 ¾ from Waikaura (F1931) by Guy Parrish (USA) tracing through mares by imported sires to the ex-Australian mare Ella G (F1897) by Vancleve (USA) from Rosebud by Tempest (F1885 by Childe Harold (USA)).

Major wins
He won the following major races:
 1948 Auckland Pacing Cup
 1949 Hannon Memorial 
 1949 Auckland Pacing Cup
 1949 NZ Stake Earner of the Year (Pacers) $21,458  
 1950 Inter Dominion 
 1953 Inter Dominion 
 1953, 1954 Easter Cup (Lord Mayor's Cup)

Captain Sandy also set a new world record on a half mile track of 1:59, breaking Greyhound's record established in 1937.  Captain Sandy amassed a total of £43,000 breaking the record of the time held by Highland Fling. He was also the highest stakes winning Thoroughbred or Standardbred, in both Australia and New Zealand until the Thoroughbred, Hydrogen won a higher amount.

Captain Sandy was second in the 1949 New Zealand Trotting Cup behind Loyal Nurse with Lady Averil third.

See also
 Harness racing in Australia
 Harness racing in New Zealand
 Inter Dominion Hall of Fame

Reference list

Auckland Pacing Cup winners
Inter Dominion winners
New Zealand standardbred racehorses
1942 racehorse births